Bhaskar Saha (born 2 January 1964) is an Indian immunologist, cell biologist and a senior scientist at National Centre for Cell Science, Pune. He is known for his contributions in the fields of immunology and cell signaling . He is an elected fellow of two of the major Indian science academies, National Academy of Sciences, India and Indian Academy of Sciences. The Council of Scientific and Industrial Research, the apex agency of the Government of India for scientific research, awarded him the Shanti Swarup Bhatnagar Prize for Science and Technology, one of the highest Indian science awards, in 2009, for his contributions to biological sciences.

Biography 
Bhaskar Saha obtained his PhD from Indian Institute of Chemical Biology, Calcutta (1993). He did his postdoctoral fellowship at Naval Medical Research Institute  and also served as Principal Investigator at NMRI, and Faculty, Dept of Medicine, USUHS, Bethesda, USA (1996–97). He joined National Centre for Cell Science in 1998 where he serves as a Scientist-G and carries out his researches on immunology and cancer biology. His early researches were focused on immunology and he has since shifted his focus to explore that therapeutic uses of his findings. At NCCS, he is involved in five projects viz. Leishmania-macrophage interaction, CD40 signaling, DC subset mediated priming against prostate cancer, Development and regulation of regulatory T cells in leishmaniasis and DC subsets in leishmaniasis and regulation of T cell response. He has published several research articles, reviews and book chapters  that could be found in Pubmed. He has also served as a faculty member of Pune University and Vidyasagar University.

Saha, who is known to have a calm and composed personality, was in the news in 2013 when he staged a hunger strike in protest against the mismanagement of research programs at National Centre for Cell Science. He is married to Ratna, a school teacher at Bharatiya Vidya Bhavan and the couple has a son, Baibaswata and a daughter, Saptaparnee. The family lives in Pune.

Awards and honors 
Saha's contributions to the biological sciences earned him the Shanti Swarup Bhatnagar Prize for Science and Technology of the Council of Scientific and Industrial Research in 2009. He was elected as a fellow by the National Academy of Sciences, India in 2011 and a year later, he became an elected fellow of the Indian Academy of Sciences. He is also recipient of National Bioscience Award for Career Development of the Department of Biotechnology in 2007.

Selected bibliography

See also 

 Immunology
 Cell signaling
 Plasticity (brain)
 Signal transduction
 Shubha Tole

Notes

References

External links 
 

Recipients of the Shanti Swarup Bhatnagar Award in Biological Science
1964 births
Scientists from Maharashtra
Scientists from West Bengal
St. Xavier's College, Mumbai alumni
Tata Institute of Fundamental Research alumni
French National Centre for Scientific Research scientists
Indian immunologists
Indian cell biologists
Indian scientific authors
Fellows of The National Academy of Sciences, India
Fellows of the Indian Academy of Sciences
Academic staff of Savitribai Phule Pune University
Vidyasagar University
Living people
20th-century Indian biologists